General Felipe Salaverry Avenue is a major avenue in Lima, Peru.

It has a total length of 38 blocks and crosses the districts of Lima, Lince, Jesús María, Magdalena del Mar and San Isidro. The central part of the avenue features a bike path. It has a residential character with medium-level vehicular traffic. Its name pays homage to former president of Peru, General Felipe Santiago Salaverry.

History
Built in the 1920s, the avenue was inaugurated in a ceremony hosted in the Jorge Chávez Plaza by then president Oscar R. Benavides in October 1936. The name of the avenue was chosen by Benavides himself, who referenced said choice in his address during the ceremony.

The avenue gave the Jesús María district a base from which it could expand, as buildings began to appear in the avenue, shaping the district's appearance. In 1971, as part of the Sesquicentennial of the Independence of Peru, the Parque de los Próceres was inaugurated, also being located in the avenue.

Route
The avenue runs across the district of Jesús María, and features several landmarks in its path, such as embassies, among others.

References

Salaverry